Robert Joseph Lombardo C.F.R. (born September 4, 1957) is an American prelate of the Roman Catholic Church who has been serving as auxiliary bishop for the Archdiocese of Chicago since 2020.

Biography

Early life 
Robert Lombardo was born on September 4, 1957, in Stamford, Connecticut.  In 1961, he entered St. Maurice Parish primary school in Stamford, then in 1971 Stamford Catholic High School.  In 1975, Lombardo entered the University of Notre Dame in Notre Dame, Indiana, graduating with an BBA in accounting in 1979. From 1979 to 1980, he worked in public accountancy at Price Waterhouse.

By 1980, Lombardo had decided to enter the priesthood, joining the Order of Friars Minor Capuchin that year. He traveled to Bolivia and Honduras in 1984 to work in parishes and with street kids.  He returned to New York City in 1985 to assist with youth programs at Our Lady of Sorrows Parish in Manhattan.

Lombardo took his perpetual vows to the Capuchin Friars in 1986.  He joined the Franciscan Friars Preaching Team in 1987, remaining with them for 14 years.  That same year he was appointed director of the Padre Pio Shelter for the Homeless in the Bronx borough of New York City and received a Master of Divinity degree from the Maryknoll School of Theology. In 1987, Lombardo co-founded the Community of Franciscan Friars of the Renewal (CFR.)

Priesthood 
Lombardo was ordained a priest for the Franciscan Friars of the Renewal on May 12, 1990, by Cardinal John O'Connor at St. Patrick's Cathedral in New York.

After his ordination, Lombardo held the following positions in New York City: 

 Founder and director of Saint Anthony Residence (1990-2004)
 Director of Saint Anthony Shelter in Bronx (1993-2004);
 Director of Saint Anthony Free Dental/Medical Clinic in Bronx (1998-2004);
 Vicar of the community (1999-2004).

In 2004, Lombardo moved to Chicago. In Chicago, Lombardo served as director of Our Lady of the Angels Mission Center (since 2005); member of the Coalition for the Homeless in Chicago (2008-2010); and member of the Institute on Religious Life (2010). In 2010, Lombardo founded the community of the Franciscans of the Eucharist of Chicago. Since 2015, he has been vicar forane of Deanery III-A in the Archdiocese of Chicago.

Auxiliary Bishop of Chicago 
Pope Francis appointed Lombardo as titular bishop of Munatiana and auxiliary bishop for the Archdiocese of Chicago on September 11, 2020. On November 13, 2020, Lombardo was consecrated by Cardinal Blase Cupich at Holy Name Cathedral in Chicago.

See also

 Catholic Church hierarchy
 Catholic Church in the United States
 Historical list of the Catholic bishops of the United States
 List of Catholic bishops of the United States
 Lists of patriarchs, archbishops, and bishops

References

External links
Roman Catholic Archdiocese of Chicago Official Site

Episcopal succession

 

1957 births
Living people
People from Stamford, Connecticut
Religious leaders from Connecticut
Roman Catholic Archdiocese of Chicago
21st-century Roman Catholic bishops in the United States
Auxiliary bishops
Roman Catholic bishops of Chicago
Bishops appointed by Pope Francis
Franciscan Friars of the Renewal